Reza Shirmarz (Persian رضا شیرمرز), is a Greece-based published and awarded playwright, translator, researcher, theatre director and essayist with more than 30 books both written and translated by him, who has been collaborating with major publishing companies, theaters, drama schools, radio channels, journals, etc. in Iran. Reza Shirmarz was elected as a member of the board of directors of Iran's Playwrights Guild for 3 ongoing years. He has also been a professional member of bodies such as Iran's Playwrights Guild, PEN America and Dramatists Guild of America. He also is a language specialist and a full member of Chartered Institute of Linguists (CIOL) in London.

Early life 

 Reza Shirmarz was born in Khoy and raised in Tehran, the capital city of Iran. His father was a ground forces general with no interest in art. Shirmarz is bilingual, speaking Persian and Turkish since childhood. He is left-handed.
Shirmarz has been influenced by great modern and classic writers and thinkers since his childhood. His siblings were all well-educated, and he was particularly influenced by his brother who was a movie fan and now is a script-writer and film director, as well as by his sister's interest in social sciences especially sociology. He began to read Persian classic literature, especially Rumi, when he was a teen. He also was quite fascinated by modern short stories, particularly the works of great modern Iranian writer, Sadegh Hedayat. He began to read intensively the non-Persian literature after a couple of years. This was the first step for him to get familiar with western literature. Later on, Shirmarz began to read more of ancient and modern drama which strengthened his creative imagination. Such an intensive reading assisted him in his playwriting and translation career in the coming years. He said once: "Reading and translation were like workshops I attended in order to learn how to create drama." Poetry is another branch of literature that the Iranian author and artist has pursued throughout his life. In addition to Iranian classic and modern poets, Shirmarz attempted to go meticulously through the eastern and western poetry as well. In the coming years he wrote a book on modern English poets T. S. Eliot, Ezra Pound and William Butler Yeats.

Career overview 

Reza Shirmarz wrote several plays of which two -Cinnamon Stars and Crystal Vines- were celebrated on a national scale in Fajr International Theater Festival and Iran's National Playwriting Contest. He also translated tens of plays and books by famous world dramatists and authors, including Aristophanes (11 plays), Menanderus (1 play), Plautus (20 plays), Terentius (2 plays), George Bernard Shaw (7 plays), Edward Bond (1 play), Somerset Maugham (5 plays), Terence Rattigan (2 plays), Clifford Odets (2 plays), Iakovos Kambanellis (6 plays), John Mortimer (5 plays), Arthur Watkyns & J.A. Ferguson, Edward Albee, Marjorie Bolton, Jean Paul Sartre, Jean Anouilh, etc. He is mostly specialised in theater and philosophy. His last book on Robert Wilson, well-known American theater director, was published in 2015 by Ghatreh publishing company in Tehran. One of his recent translations from Greek into Persian was Aristotle's Poetics which was published in 2018 in Tehran by a major publishing company called Ghoghnoos. Although some of his works were already published at the time of President Mohammad Khatami, they have been constantly censored and banned by the Iranian official authorities since the presidency of Mahmoud Ahmadinezhad, but he never gave up creating new pieces of art and translating drama and philosophy into Persian. More than six of his works, such as Cinnamon Stars, Crystal Vines, Deep Blue Sea, Yellow Snow Falls, etc. are officially announced as forbidden to be published and distributed. One of his translations is The Big knife by Clifford Odets which has been prohibited for more than a decade.

Migration 
Reza Shirmarz moved to Greece in 2010 to do research on ancient Greek culture and civilization, learn Greek language while studying at the university of Athens and translate Greek theatrical and philosophical works into Persian directly from Greek. Six plays of Iakovos Kambanellis were the first series of theatrical works he translated directly from Greek language into Persian. He received a scholarship from the Greek Ministry of Foreign Affairs with the effort and assistance of Konstantinos Passalis, the cultural deputy of Greek embassy in Iran in 2009.

He has been translating the complete works of Aristotle into Persian language of which the first volume (The Poetics) was published in 2017. The book was sold out in a short time and was republished in 2020. Reza Shirmarz announced in one of his recent interviews that he is translating the eight books of Aristotle into Persian at the moment along with other projects he is carrying out. He said that Rhetoric is going to be published soon by major Iranian publishing company called Ghoghnoos. In addition to his research and translation activities, Shirmarz wrote several plays such as Immigrants, The Corners of Death, The Pipe, Tsunami, etc. in English while living in Greece. His play Immigrants was translated into Greece a couple of years ago.

Plays 

Cinnamon Stars (celebrated play in Fajr International Theater Festival and National Playwriting Competition, published by Namayesh Publication Center, 2007). This play was given a reading in the National Theater located in Tehran. Next year the playwright attempted to direct it with a professional crew, but the performance was banned by official authorities after long rehearsals.
 Crystal Vines (celebrated play in Fajr International Theater Festival and published by Namayesh Publication Center, 2008). This play was read in National Theater as well, but banned at the time of performance as well in 2009.
My Hands (published in Theater Magazine, 2009)
 Deep Blue Sea (published in a literary magazine called Payab, 2010)
 Meeting (2011)
 Yellow Snow Falls (2012) (published in a literary magazine called Payab, 2011)
 The Corners of Death (2013), a modern four-part play
 Acharnon Street Vulture (2014)
 Lanterns Are Weeping (2014), the third part of the trilogy called Cinnamon Stars
 Immigrants (2015, English); this one-act play was translated into Greek by Nikos Anastasopoulos in 2016.
 Tsunami (2016)
 The Pipe (2019)
 Muzzled (2022): This play is a response to Samuel Beckett's Catastrophe, a short play which was written in support of dissident Czech Vaclav Havel. Muzzled was published by Index on Censorship on January 12, 2022. Catastrophe by Beckett and Mistake by Havel were published together by Index in 1984. Muzzled was also published by Index in the 50th anniversary birthday of the Sage journal in January 2022.

Books 

 Stage Speech: Practical Exercises, published by Ghatreh Publication Company, 1st edition in 2012 and 12th edition in 2020.
 I think through my eyes, on Robert Wilson’s Visual Theater, Ghatreh Publishing Company, 2015.
 Comedy (forthcoming)
 The Philosophy of Theater (forthcoming)

Translations 
The Bad-Tempered, Menander, Sooreh University Press, 2000.
 The complete plays of Aristophanes: Acharnians, The Knights, The Clouds, The Wasps, Peace, Lysistrata, The Birds, The Frogs, Thesmophoriazuse, Ecclesiazuse, and Plutus, in Seven volumes, Ghatreh Publishing Company, 2015.
 The complete plays of Plautus: Amphitryon, The Comedy of Asses, The Pot of Gold, Two Bacchides, Casket, Curculio, Epidicus, Menaachi, Merchant, Braggart Soldier, Haunted House, The Girl From Persia, Carthaginians, Psudolous, The Rope, Stichus, Trinummus, Triculentus, Casina & The Captives, in three volumes, Ghatreh Publishing Company, 2002.
 The Anatomy of Drama, Marjourie Boulton, Ghatreh Publishing Company, 1st edition in 2003 & 4th edition in 2013.
 Stage for Speech, by Evangeline Machlin, Ghatreh Publishing Company, First edition 2003 & 10th 2013.
 Seven One-act plays by George Bernard Shaw: How He Lied to Her Husband, The Glimpse of Reality, Augustus Does His Bit, Passion Poison & Petrifaction, The Shewing-Up of Blanco Posnet, The Dark Lady of the Sonnets, Annajanska The Bolshevik Empress, Ghatreh Publishing Company, 2007.
 Great Peace by Edward Bond, Ghatreh Publishing Company, 2009.
 Golden boy, Clifford Odets, Ghatreh Publishing Company, 2009.
 Essays on Aesthetics, by Jean-Paul Sartre, 1st edition in 2001 & 6th edition in 2005, Ahange Digar Publication, 2009.
 Evoking Shakespeare by Peter Brook, Ghatreh Publishing Company, 2009.
 Orchestra & The Dye-Hard, two one-act plays by Jean Anhoui and Harold Brighouse, Ghatreh Publishing Company. 2009.
 The Boy Comes Home & The Londonderry air, two plays by A. A. Milne & Rachel Field, Ghatreh Publishing Company, 2010.
 He & His Trousers & The Wrong Man & Woman by Iakovos Kambanellis, Ghatreh Publishing Company, 2010.
 Sheppy by Somerset Maugham, Ghatreh Publishing Company, 2010.
 The World Encyclopedia of Contemporary Theater, Volume 5: Asia/Pacific, Ghatreh Publishing Company, 2010, celebrated as the best educational book of the year in Roshd Book Festival.
 Ancient Roman Comedies: Andria & Phormio by Terence, Ghatreh Publishing Company, 2010.
 The Dock Brief & Women at War, two plays by John Mortimer and Edward Percy, Ghatreh Publishing Company, 2010.
 Browning Version & Adventure Story by Terence Rattigan, Ghatreh Publishing Company, 2010.
 Letter to Orestes & Thebes Sidestreets by Iakovos Kambanellis, Ghatreh Publishing Company, 2011.
 Characters for Violin and Orchestra by Iakovos Kambanellis, Ghatreh Publishing Company, 2011.
 Such Stuff As Dreams & Wanted, Mr Stuart!, two plays by J.A. Ferguson and Arthur Watkyn, Ghatreh Publishing Company, 2012. 
 Poetics by Aristotles, from Greek language, Ghoghnoos Publishing Company,1st edition 2017, 2nd edition 2020.
 Rhetoric by Aristotles, from Greek language (forthcoming)

Articles and essays 

The Post-modern Literature of Samuel Beckett, in Kelk Literary Magazine, Tehran, 2004.
 An Analytical View on "The Clouds", A Comedy by Aristophanes, in Hamshahri Philosophical Magazine, Tehran, 2007.
 Structural Analysis of Aristophanes’ Comedy-writing, in Tehran University, Tehran, 2008.
 Iakovos Kambanellis, A Contemporary Greek playwright, in Directors’ Center Book, 1st volume, 2012.
 Theater and Phenomenology, in Directors’ Center Book, 2nd volume, 2013.
 Dramatic Interaction, The Linguist, Vol 54/N 1, Chartered Institute of Linguists, 2015.
 Dancing in Chain, The Linguist, Vol 54/N 5, Chartered Institute of Linguists, 2015.
A Short Review of Children Theater in Greece, Theater Magazine, 2015.
 Stage Design in Greek Theater, Theater Magazine, 2015.
 An Introduction to Contemporary Greek Theater, Theater Magazine, 2015.
 Desperate Liaisons, The Linguist, Vol 55/N 2, Chartered Institute of Linguists, 2016.
 Theater Architecture in Modern Greece, Theater Magazine, 2016.
 Playwriting in Modern Greece, Theater Magazine, 2016.
 What Does Theater Mean, Theater Magazine, 2017.
An Introduction to Contemporary Theater of Egypt, Theater Magazine, 2017.

Collaborations 
Reza Shirmarz translated two essays on African rituals and their theatrical aspects which were published as parts of a book called Drama and Religion published in Fajr International Theater Festival by Iran's Performing arts center in 2007. He has been also active in various Iranian radio channels as writer, translator and narrator for more than a decade. Shirmarz has adapted and translated more than 100 dramatic works to be performed in radio and has been active as a theater critic as well for several years. Despite all his artistic efforts in Iranian mainstream theater and media, he and his colleagues were deprived of their activities at the time of Mahmood Ahmadinezhad, the extremely fundamentalist Iranian president who was elected in year 2009. Shirmarz was also active in the administrative part of Fajr International Theater Festival for three years at the time of reformist Iranian president Mohammad Khatami from 2001 to 2004. He has worked with several literary or theatrical magazines (Kelk, Theater, Payab, etc.), journals (The Linguist in London), newspapers (Hamshahri, Farhikhtegan, Shargh, Jame'e, etc.), news agencies (IBNA, ISNA, etc.) for almost two decades since the outset of his career. He has also been giving speeches and lectures as a playwright, theater director, researcher, theorist and critic in different performing arts centers in Iran, mostly in Tehran. Reza Shirmarz became an honorary member of Vanagahan Theater Group in Iran and conducted a number of voice and speech workshops for the actors of the group. He also performed some vocal parts of some of the performances of the group in three languages a couple of years ago.

Memberships 

 A full member of Chartered Institute of Linguists (CIOL) in London
 A full member of Iran's Playwrights Guild
 A full of PEN America 
 A professional member of Dramatists Guild of America
 A board member of Iran's Playwrights Guild

References

External links
 rezashirmarz.ir
 rezashirmarz.com

Living people
Iranian translators
Iranian dramatists and playwrights
Iranian essayists
Iranian theatre directors
Vocal coaches
Speech coaches
Iranian writers
1974 births
Persian-language poets